Grodnica may refer to the following places in Poland:
Grodnica, Lower Silesian Voivodeship (south-west Poland)
Grodnica, Greater Poland Voivodeship (west-central Poland)